Cattaraugus (an Iroquoian word roughly translated to "foul-smelling banks") may refer to:

Places
 Cattaraugus, New York
 Cattaraugus County, New York
 Cattaraugus Creek, a tributary of Lake Erie in New York
 Cattaraugus Reservation, one of the two major reservations of the Seneca Nation of New York
 Cattaraugus Reservation, Cattaraugus County, New York
 Cattaraugus Reservation, Chautauqua County, New York
 Cattaraugus Reservation, Erie County, New York
 Canawaugus, New York, a former Seneca village in Livingston County, New York, using an alternate pronunciation and spelling

Other
Cattaraugus Cutlery Company